Indian Paintbrush is an American film production company founded in 2006 by businessman Steven M. Rales. It is based in Santa Monica, California. Indian Paintbrush specializes in the production and distribution of mainly comedy-drama and romantic films. Since 2007 with The Darjeeling Limited, Indian Paintbrush has had a production credit for each of filmmaker Wes Anderson's films, including The Grand Budapest Hotel which was nominated at the Academy Awards for Best Picture. Furthermore, Indian Paintbrush has a long-term deal with Searchlight Pictures. Other films produced include Like Crazy, Stoker, Me and Earl and the Dying Girl, and Seeking a Friend for the End of the World.

List of releases

Released films

Upcoming films

References

2006 establishments in California
American companies established in 2006
Companies based in Santa Monica, California
Entertainment companies based in California
Film production companies of the United States
Mass media companies established in 2006